Gheorghe Crăciun (8 May 1950, Zărnești – 30 January 2007, Constanța) was a Romanian writer and translator. 

Crăciun was born in Tohanu Vechi, now part of Zărnești, Brașov County. In addition to being a novelist and a translator, he was also a literary theorist.
He graduated from High School in Sighișoara, and later studied at the Philology Department of the University of Bucharest. From 1990 he taught at the Department of Literature at Braşov University. In 2002 he received a doctorate in literature from Bucharest University for his thesis on Transitivity in Modernist and Post-Modernist Romanian Poetry. He is considered an important author among Romanian literary figures from the 1980s.

Bibliography
Romanian novels
Acte originale. Copii legalizate (1982)
Compunere cu paralele inegale (1988) 
Frumoasa fără corp  (1993)
Pupa russa (2004)

Translated works
Experiment in Romanian Post-War Literature (1998)
Images & Texts / lmages et textes (2000)
Composition aux paralleles inegales (2001)

Notes

External links
  Article marking Gheorghe Crǎciun's death, Cotidianul, 31 January 2007

People from Zărnești
Romanian writers
1950 births
2007 deaths